Scott Cove is a locality on the west side of Gilford Island in the Queen Charlotte Strait region of the Central Coast of British Columbia, Canada, located at the cove of the same name.

See also
List of settlements in British Columbia

References

Bays of British Columbia
Central Coast of British Columbia
Unincorporated settlements in British Columbia
Coves of Canada